The Nanny Express is a Hallmark Channel television film. It premiered on Hallmark Channel on July 11, 2008, and stars Vanessa Marcil, Dean Stockwell, and Brennan Elliott.

Plot

After the passing of their mother three years prior, Ben and Emily have driven their father David crazy by driving away 20 nannies with sabotaged appliances and Ben's pet rat in the clothes. The film shows a life of a young girl, Kate, who looks after her dad. She is looking for work and Beverly Hills offers her a job as a nanny for David’s family. The children take an immediate dislike to her as she is "just another maid." After all the incidents, she takes it surprisingly well yet the kids expect her to leave. After a while of shenanigans, Kate and Ben become friends yet Emily keeps her distance. Eventually, David reveals to Kate that his wife was hit and killed by a drunk driver which badly affected Emily as this happened on her birthday. Emily doesn't want her father to date Kate and plans to set him up with her ballet teacher.

Cast
 Vanessa Marcil as Kate Hewitt
 Dean Stockwell as Jerry Hewitt
 Brennan Elliott as David Chandler
 Natalie Dreyfuss as Emily Chandler
 Uriah Shelton as Ben Chandler
 Stacy Keach as Reverend McGregor
 David Barry Gray as Chris Wells

Reception
Nanny Express did well for Hallmark Channel on the date of its premiere. The film became the highest-rated cable movie of the day and week that it premiered with a 3.1 HH (household) rating, 2.7 million homes and 3.6 million total viewers.

References

External links

The Nanny Express at Hallmark Channel

2000s English-language films
2008 films
2008 television films
Films directed by Bradford May
Hallmark Channel original films